Muskuraane Ki Vajah Tum Ho is an Indian Hindi-language television drama series that aired from 1 June 2022 to 23 September 2022 on Colors TV. It is digitally available on Voot. Produced by Pia Bajpayee and Shaika Parween under Satori Media, it starred Tanvi Malhara, Kunal Jaisingh and Abhishek Malik.

Plot 
The show revolves around the Katha Rawat, Kabir Singh Shekhawat and Yuvraj Singh Shekhawat. Katha lives in Nainital with her mother, Uma Rawat and sister, Manyata Rawat. She works for a NGO and Kabir lives in Udaipur with his family.

Katha fall in love with Rahul but he betrayed her. Later, Katha finds out that she is pregnant with Rahul's child. Meanwhile, Kabir also comes to Nainital and falls for Katha. Kabir proposes Katha for marriage, at first Katha refuses but later agrees on the persuasion of her mother and sister.

It turns out that Rahul is none other than Kabir's younger brother Yuvraj. Katha and her family come to Udaipur from Nainital for her and Kabir's wedding. In Udaipur, Yuvraj is shocked to see Katha as her to-be sister-in-law. Kabir and Katha finally get married. After the wedding, Katha sees Yuvraj and gets shocked to learn that Yuvraj is Rahul.

While Katha gives an ultimatum to Yuvraj, he tries various methods in order to stop Katha. The Shekhawats love Katha, but Madhu is irked by her. Kishore, Manju and Deepa always support Katha. Yuvraj make Manyata fall in love with him, so that he can avenge Katha.

Katha who had decide to keep Yuvraj's secret for Kabir's betterment, decides to tell everyone about him in order to save Mannu. The Shekhawats does not believe her and Kabir slips into coma due to shock. Katha gives everyone a proof against Yuvraj and everyone accepts her. She confess her love for Kabir and he comes out of coma.

Yuvraj tries to harm Katha when everyone decide to send him to jail. When he tries to kill Kabir, Katha shoot him to save Kabir and Yuvraj dies. Katha accepts her crime and gets bail due to self-defence

7 months later

Katha gives birth to a baby girl, Muskaan Katha Shekhawat. She, Kabir and the whole family rejoice as the show ends on a happy note.

Cast

Main 
 Tanvi Malhara as Katha Kabir Singh Shekhawat (née Katha Rawat) – Uma's daughter; Manyata's sister; Neeti's cousin; Kabir's wife; Rahul's ex-girlfriend; Muskaan's mother 
 Kunal Jaisingh as Kabir Singh Shekhawat – Savitri's son; Manju, Madhu, Deepa and Yuvraj's brother; Katha's husband; Muskaan's father
 Abhishek Malik as Yuvraj "Yuvi" Singh Shekhawat/Rahul Srivastava (fake identity)– Savitri's son; Manju, Madhu, Kabir and Deepa's brother; Katha's ex-boyfriend; Manyata's former fiancé; Muskaan's biological father (Dead)

Recurring 
 Moonmoon Banerjee as Uma Rawat – Katha and Manyata's mother; Neeti's aunt; Muskaan's maternal grandmother
 Alisha Parveen as Manyata "Mannu" Rawat – Uma's daughter; Katha's sister; Neeti's cousin; Yuvraj's former fiancé
 Pratichi Mishra as Savitri Shekhawat – Kabir, Yuvraj, Manju, Madhu and Deepa's mother; Muskaan's grandmother
 Deepali Pansare as Manju Shekhawat – Savitri's daughter; Kabir, Madhu, Deepa and Yuvraj's sister; Kishore wife 
 Jignesh Joshi as Kishore – Manju's husband; Katha's sworn brother
 Neha Narang as Madhu "Maddy" Shekhawat – Savitri's daughter; Kabir, Manju, Deepa and Yuvraj's sister; Yash's wife; Uday's mother 
 Hiten Paintal as Yash – Madhu's husband; Uday's father 
 Milan Singh as Deepa Shekhawat – Savitri's daughter; Kabir, Manju, Madhu and Yuvraj's sister; Ravi's wife; Aryan's mother 
Pankh Thakur as Ravi – Deepa's husband; Aryan's father 
Raanav Sharma as Aryan – Deepa and Ravi's son 
 Dipali Kamath as Bhavri Shekhawat – Devraj's mother; Manju, Madhu, Deepa, Yuvraj and Kabir's aunt 
 Bobby Khanna as Kabir's uncle; Bhavri's husband; Devraj's father
 Rishikesh Ingley as Devraj Shekhawat – Bhavri's son; Neelam's husband; Kabir's cousin; Katha's sworn brother
 Ambika Soni as Neelam Shekhawat – Devraj's wife; Gunjan's sister
Sejal Kamwani as Neeti Rawat – Katha and Manyata's cousin; Mukesh's former fiancé
 Shubh Karan as Tony – Yuvraj's best friend 
 Yogeshraj Bedi as Bhushan – Yuvraj's best friend 
 Pallavi Singh as Jyoti Verma – Pihu's mother; Mukesh's ex-girlfriend 
 Aadil Roy as Mukesh – Pihu's father; Jyoti's ex-boyfriend; Neeti's former fiancé 
 Dhwani Hetal Parmar as Pihu Verma – Jyoti and Mukesh's daughter 
Akanksha Saini as Shabnam Khan – An inspector, Katha's helper

Soundtrack

Muskuraane Ki Vajah Tum Ho's soundtrack was composed by Indradip Dasgupta and the title song was sung by Rahul Jain.

Awards and nominations

See also
List of programs broadcast by Colors TV

References

External links 

 Muskuraane Ki Vajah Tum Ho at Colors TV
 Muskuraane Ki Vajah Tum Ho on Voot

2022 Indian television series debuts
Indian drama television series
Colors TV original programming
Hindi-language television shows
Indian romance television series